Pedro Antonio Sánchez Moñino (born 12 December 1986) is a Spanish professional footballer who plays for Hércules CF as a right winger.

He appeared in 358 matches in the Segunda División during his career, representing a host of clubs.

Club career
Born in Aspe, Province of Alicante, Pedro Sánchez graduated from Alicante CF's youth setup, and made his senior debut with the reserves in 2005. He was definitely promoted to the main squad in summer 2008, and made his debut as a professional on 23 November, coming on as a second-half substitute in a 0–0 away draw against Rayo Vallecano in the Segunda División.

Pedro Sánchez scored his first professional goal on 1 March 2009, netting his team's first in a 2–1 victory at SD Eibar. He finished the season with 27 appearances and two goals, as the Valencians were relegated.

On 22 June 2009, Pedro Sánchez signed with Segunda División B club Real Murcia. In his second year he scored a career-best 13 goals, helping the Pimentoneros return to the second tier at the first attempt.

On 17 July 2012, Pedro Sánchez joined Córdoba CF also in division two. He continued to compete in that league the following seasons, representing Real Zaragoza, Elche CF, Granada CF, Deportivo de La Coruña and Albacete Balompié.

References

External links

1986 births
Living people
People from Vinalopó Mitjà
Sportspeople from the Province of Alicante
Spanish footballers
Footballers from the Valencian Community
Association football wingers
Segunda División players
Segunda División B players
Tercera División players
Segunda Federación players
Divisiones Regionales de Fútbol players
Alicante CF footballers
Real Murcia players
Córdoba CF players
Real Zaragoza players
Elche CF players
Granada CF footballers
Deportivo de La Coruña players
Albacete Balompié players
Hércules CF players